Dilici is a small settlement east of Koštabona in the City Municipality of Koper in the Littoral region of Slovenia.

References

External links
Dilici on Geopedia

Populated places in the City Municipality of Koper